The 2012–13 season was 126th season of Cheltenham Town's existence, and their 13th in the Football League since promotion from the Conference National in 2000.

Cheltenham's first game of the 2012–13 season was at home to Milton Keynes Dons in the League Cup, before then hosting Dagenham and Redbridge in their first League Two match of the season on 18 August 2012.

Cheltenham were in contention for automatic promotion until the final day of the season, but ultimately finished 5th and had to settle for the playoffs, in which they lost 2–0 on aggregate to Northampton Town.

First team
As of 30 March 2013.

Transfers

In

Out

Competitions

Overall

League Two

Standings

Results summary

Results by round

Scores Overview 
Cheltenham Town score given first.

Matches

Pre-season friendlies

League Two

League Cup

Football League Trophy

See also
2012–13 in English football
2012–13 Football League Two

References

Cheltenham Town F.C. seasons
Cheltenham Town